

Places 

 Hillegersberg is a neighbourhood in Northern Rotterdam
Hillegersberg-Schiebroek is a borough in northern Rotterdam.

People 

 Jos van Hillegersberg (born 1968), Dutch computer scientist